Drunk Wedding is a 2015 American comedy film directed by Nick Weiss and written by Anthony Weiss and Nick Weiss. The film stars Nick P. Ross, J.R. Ramirez, Christian Cooke, Bethany Dwyer, Dan Gill and Victoria Gold. The film was released on May 22, 2015, by Paramount Pictures.

Cast 
Nick P. Ross as Linc
J.R. Ramirez as Cal
Christian Cooke as John
Bethany Dwyer as Maggie
Dan Gill as Phil
Victoria Gold as Elissa
Anne Gregory as Daphne
Genevieve Jones as Sarah
Nate Lang as Ivan
Carlos Lugo as Porter
Gabriela Revilla Lugo as Wedding Planner
Diana Newton as Tammy
Corbett Tuck as Gloria

Release
The film was released at 16 Alamo Drafthouse theaters on May 22, 2015, alongside VOD and digital download.

References

External links 
 

2015 films
American comedy films
2015 comedy films
Paramount Pictures films
2010s English-language films
2010s American films